The men's 3000 metres steeplechase event at the 2006 Commonwealth Games was held on March 24.

Results

References
Results

3000
2006